The Baxter Bulletin is the daily newspaper serving Mountain Home, Arkansas and Baxter County, Arkansas, and surrounding areas. In 1976, the paper was acquired by Multimedia; Gannett acquired Multimedia in 1995.

References

External links

The Baxter Bulletin online edition

Newspapers published in Arkansas
Gannett publications
Mountain Home, Arkansas
1901 establishments in Arkansas
Publications established in 1901
Baxter County, Arkansas